Belén de Umbría is a town and municipality in the Department of Risaralda, Colombia.  At an elevation of 1,634 metres, it is located at approx. 1.5 hours drive from the city of Pereira. Its population is about 21,000 inhabitants.

References

Sources
 Luis Angel Arango Library: Belen de Umbria; Before and After its Foundation.

Municipalities of Risaralda Department